Juliana Daniel Shonza (born 23 April 1987) is a Tanzanian politician and member of the ruling Chama Cha Mapinduzi (CCM) party. She is the current Deputy Minister of Information, Culture, Arts and Sports. She is a one-term Member of Parliament having been appointed to special seat reserved for women.

Background and education
Juliana Daniel Shonza was born on 23 April 1987 in Songwe Region. She completed her schooling from Kibasila Secondary School in 2005 and Dakawa high school in 2008. Her first Bachelor on Sociology from 2008 to 2011 and master's degree on Sociology from 2013 to 2015 from University of Dar es Salaam and University of Dodoma.

Political career
Shonza became involved in politics while she was at the University of Dar es Salaam as the Vice Chairperson of National Youth Council of Chadema. In 2013 she moved to Chama Cha Mapinduzi where she was appointed to the post of Assistant Secretary of Motivation at the CCM headquarters. During the general election of 2015, Juliana Shonza was appointed as a member of Tanzanian Parliament through special women seats to reserve for 2015 to 2020.

In 2017, she was appointed as a Deputy Minister in the Ministry for Information, Culture, Arts and Sports by President John Magufuli during the changes he made on 9 October 2017. She is serving in the cabinet under the Minister Dr. Harrison Mwakyembe.

References

1987 births
Living people
Chama Cha Mapinduzi MPs
Tanzanian MPs 2015–2020
Deputy government ministers of Tanzania
University of Dodoma
University of Dar es Salaam alumni
Women government ministers of Tanzania
Chama Cha Mapinduzi politicians